The 1991 Brown Bears football team was an American football team that represented Brown University during the 1991 NCAA Division I-AA football season. Brown tied for last in the Ivy League. 

In their second season under head coach Mickey Kwiatkowski, the Bears compiled a 1–9 record and were outscored 372 to 227. J. Pankau and Rodd Torbert were the team captains. 

The Bears' 1–6 conference record tied for seventh (and worst) in the Ivy League standings. They were outscored 246 to 163 by Ivy opponents. Brown's only win was in the final week of the year, against fellow cellar-dweller Columbia.

Brown played its home games at Brown Stadium in Providence, Rhode Island.

Schedule

References

Brown
Brown Bears football seasons
Brown Bears football